Mounir Baatour (born 1970) is a Tunisian lawyer and LGBT activist. He is the leader of the Tunisian Liberal Party, and was the first openly gay presidential candidate in the Arab world.

LGBT activism and presidential campaign 
Baatour was arrested in 2013 and jailed for 3 months for sodomy, for charges that he always denied. According to, the Sheraton hotel is suspected of  collaborating with the authorities and may have  informed the police of the presence of  Baatour with another man in one of their hotel room. 

In 2015 Baatour co-founded  Association Shams, an LGBT rights association focused on the decriminalisation of homosexuality. He is currently president of the association. In 2018, together with Alice Nkom, Baatour received the Idaho France prize for freedom, for his fight against homophobia.

On 8 August 2019, Baatour announced his participation to the Tunisian presidential election. Following this announcement, an estimated 650 articles from 120 different countries were written about him, and  Baatour built a campaign team with 300 local activists. His political program included the repeal of Article 230, which outlaws homosexuality, from the Tunisian criminal code, as well as gender equality and the protection of the rights of minorities. However, despite collecting nearly double the 10,000 signatures required for his nomination eligibility, the election authority rejected his candidacy without providing serious reasons.

After receiving death threats from Islamists, Baatour fled to France in January 2020, where he was accepted as a political refugee.

Baatour lives in Marseille where he practices as a lawyer at the Marseille bar. On December 20th 2022, Baatour married in Marseille with the man he was arrested with in Tunisia ten years earlier.

See also 
 LGBT rights in Tunisia
 2019 Tunisian presidential election

References 

Tunisian LGBT people
20th-century Tunisian lawyers
Tunisian politicians
1970 births
Living people
Tunisian LGBT rights activists
21st-century Tunisian lawyers